Eric Jonsson (1 October 1903 – 1974) was a Swedish chess player.

Biography
Eric Jonsson was one of Sweden’s strongest chess players in the 1920s and 1930s. He was six-time Gothenburg chess champion (1925, 1926, 1928, 1935, 1936 and 1942). In 1937, Eric Jonsson played a small demonstration match with Reuben Fine (as part of the tour of the American chess grandmaster in Sweden) - ½: 1½. In 1948, with the Swedish national team, he participated in a number of international chess matches with the teams of Denmark and Norway.

Eric Jonsson has played for Sweden in the Chess Olympiads:
 In 1928, at reserve board in the 2nd Chess Olympiad in The Hague (+2, =7, -5),
 In 1937, at reserve board in the 7th Chess Olympiad in Stockholm (+2, =5, -4).

References

External links
 
 

1903 births
1974 deaths
Swedish chess players
Chess Olympiad competitors
20th-century chess players